Nans-les-Pins is a commune in the Var department in the Provence-Alpes-Côte d'Azur region in southeastern France. It lies in the western part of the department, north of the Sainte-Baume ridge.

See also
Communes of the Var department

References

Communes of Var (department)